HMS Anson was the last of six  ironclad battleships built for the Royal Navy during the 1880s. The ship was completed, except for her armament, in 1887, but had to wait two years for her guns to be installed. She was assigned to the Channel Fleet in mid-1889 as a flagship for the fleet's second-in-command. Two years later, the passenger ship  sank with the loss of 562 lives after colliding with Anson in the Bay of Gibraltar.  In mid-1893, Anson was transferred to the Mediterranean Fleet, subsequently returning home in 1900 when she was assigned to the Reserve Fleet. She recommissioned for the Home Fleet in early 1901. Anson was paid off three years later and then sold for scrap in 1909.

Design and description
They displaced  at normal load, some  heavier than Howe and Rodney and  heavier than the first ship of the class, . The ships had a complement of 525–536 officers and ratings.

Propulsion
Anson was powered by two 3-cylinder inverted compound-expansion steam engines, each driving one propeller.

Armament
Unlike Collingwood, the later four Admiral-class ships had a main armament of 30-calibre rifled breech-loading (BL)  Mk II guns, rather than the  guns in the earlier ship. The four guns were mounted in two twin-gun, pear-shaped barbettes, one forward and one aft of the superstructure. The barbettes were open, without hoods or gun shields, and the guns were fully exposed. There were significant delays in the production of the heavy guns for this ship and her sisters, due to cracking in the innermost layer of the guns, that significantly delayed the delivery of these ships.

The secondary armament of the Admirals consisted of six 26-calibre BL  Mk IV guns on single mounts positioned on the upper deck amidships, three on each broadside. They fired  shells that were credited with the ability to penetrate  of wrought iron at 1000 yards. Beginning around 1895 all of these guns were converted into quick-firing guns (QF) with a much faster rate of fire. For defence against torpedo boats the ships carried a dozen QF 6-pounder Hotchkiss guns and 10 QF 3-pounder Hotchkiss guns.

Armour
The armour scheme of Anson and Camperdown was virtually identical to that of Collingwood, although the thickness of the armour plate on the barbettes was increased as was the length of the waterline armour belt.

Construction and career

Anson, named after Admiral and First Lord of the Admiralty, George Anson, 1st Baron Anson, was the sixth ship of her name to serve in the Royal Navy. The ship was laid down at Pembroke Dockyard on 24 April 1883, launched on 17 February 1886 and was delivered at Portsmouth in March 1887, complete except for her main armament, at a cost of £662,582. She was finally commissioned on 28 May 1889 as the flagship of the second-in-command of the Channel Fleet. On 17 March 1891, the passenger steamer  was accidentally blown onto the ram of the anchored Anson during a strong gale in the Bay of Gibraltar. 562 of Utopias passengers and crew and two rescuers from the armoured cruiser  were killed in the accident. Anson did not report any injuries or damage.

In September 1893, Anson was transferred to the Mediterranean, where she served until January 1900, with a refit at Malta in 1896. She returned home and paid off at Devonport in January 1901, re-commissioning for the newly formed Home Fleet in March of the same year. She served as guard ship at Queensferry under Captain William Fisher in 1902, and took part in the fleet review held at Spithead on 16 August 1902 for the coronation of King Edward VII. In May 1904, Anson finally paid off into reserve, where she remained until she was sold for scrap on 13 July 1909. The ship was sold for £21,200 and subsequently broken up at Upnor.

Footnotes

References

External links

MaritimeQuest HMS Anson Pages

 

Admiral-class battleships
Victorian-era battleships of the United Kingdom
Ships built in Pembroke Dock
1886 ships
Maritime incidents in 1891